The enzyme S-(hydroxymethyl)glutathione synthase (EC 4.4.1.22) catalyzes the reaction

S-(hydroxymethyl)glutathione  glutathione + formaldehyde

This enzyme belongs to the family of lyases, specifically the class of carbon-sulfur lyases.  The systematic name of this enzyme class is ''S-(hydroxymethyl)glutathione formaldehyde-lyase (glutathione-forming). Other names in common use include glutathione-dependent formaldehyde-activating enzyme, Gfa, and S''-(hydroxymethyl)glutathione formaldehyde-lyase.  This enzyme participates in methane metabolism.

References 

 

EC 4.4.1
Enzymes of unknown structure